Shorten is an English surname.

Origin
Theories about the origin of this surname include:
 it originates from the village of Shorton in Devon, England
 it originates from the Norman name Shorten, which was used for stock or short-necked people

Notable people
Notable people with this surname include:
 Anthony Shorten, Australian politician
 Bill Shorten, Australian politician
 Chick Shorten, American baseball player
 George Shorten, Australian rules footballer
 Jack Shorten, Australian rules footballer
 Paul Shorten, Canadian football player
 Teddy Shorten, Australian rules footballer

References